Witold Ziaja (born November 16, 1940 in Siemianowice Śląskie, Upper Silesia) is a former field hockey player from Poland, who competed in the 1972 Summer Olympics and in the 1976 Summer Olympics.

Ziaja played 79 international matches for Poland, and scored a total number of 18 goals. Throughout his career Ziaja played for HKS Siemianowiczanka from Siemianowice Śląskie.

After his active career Ziaja became a hockey coach. He guided the Austrian Women's Hockey Team  in 1973, the Polish Men’s National Team from 1974 to 1980, and the Swiss Men’s National team from 1981 to 1983.

He lives in Hamburg, Germany now.

External links
 
 Biography in Polish 
 sports-reference

1940 births
Living people
Polish male field hockey players
Olympic field hockey players of Poland
Field hockey players at the 1960 Summer Olympics
Field hockey players at the 1972 Summer Olympics
People from Siemianowice Śląskie
Sportspeople from Silesian Voivodeship